Einar Larsen (7 June 1900 – 2 February 1981) was a Danish footballer who played as a forward. He made 14 appearances for the Denmark national team from 1923 to 1929.

References

External links
 

1900 births
1981 deaths
Danish men's footballers
Footballers from Copenhagen
Association football forwards
Denmark international footballers